Nepal Dalit Sangh (Prajatantrik) was a Nepalese Dalit movement linked to the Nepali Congress (Democratic). NDS(P) was formed through a split away from the Nepal Dalit Sangh. Shambuhajara Paswan was the general secretary of NSD(P).

With the reunification of NC and NC(D) in 2007, the NDS and NDS(P) were also reunified.

References

Dalit wings of political parties in Nepal
2007 disestablishments in Nepal